Freddie Goss is an American retired college basketball player and coach.

Goss played at UCLA under Hall of Fame coach John Wooden from 1962 to 1966 and started at guard with All-American Gail Goodrich on the Bruins' 1964–65 national championship team.

After his playing days were over, Goss became a college coach.  His first stint was at UC Riverside, where he coached from 1969 to 1979, amassing a record of 163–110 (.597).  He then moved to US International University in San Diego, where he led the Gulls' move to division I.  Goss went 36–110 in his six years at the school.

Head coaching record

College basketball

References 

Year of birth missing (living people)
Living people
African-American basketball coaches
American men's basketball players
Basketball coaches from California
Basketball players from Compton, California
College men's basketball head coaches in the United States
Guards (basketball)
Parade High School All-Americans (boys' basketball)
Sportspeople from Compton, California
UC Riverside Highlanders men's basketball coaches
UCLA Bruins men's basketball players
21st-century African-American people